The 1991 season of the Paraguayan Primera División, the top category of Paraguayan football, was played by 12 teams. The national champions were Sol de América.

Results

First stage

Second stage

Quarterfinals

Group A

Group B

Semifinal play-offs

Final play-offs

External links
Paraguay 1991 season at RSSSF

Para
Paraguayan Primera División seasons
1